Borja Martínez Giner (born 2 March 1994), known as simply Borja, is a Spanish footballer who plays as a left winger for Hércules CF.

Club career
Born in Alicante, Valencian Community, Borja joined Hércules CF's youth system in 2004 at the age of 10, and started playing as a senior with the reserves in the regional divisions. He made his professional debut with the first team on 20 January 2013, playing the last 17 minutes of the 3–0 home win against CD Lugo in the Segunda División championship.

On 12 July 2013, Borja signed a 2+2 contract with RCD Espanyol, being assigned to the B-team in Segunda División B. On 11 August of the following year he moved to Cultural y Deportiva Leonesa, in the same division.

On 23 July 2016, Borja moved to Lorca FC also in the third tier. The following 11 July, after helping the club in their first promotion ever to the second division, he joined CD Ebro.

On 28 June 2018, Borja signed for Elche CF in the second level. On 14 August of the following year, after contributing with only one goal during the campaign, he cut ties with the club.

References

External links

1994 births
Living people
Footballers from Alicante
Spanish footballers
Association football wingers
Segunda División players
Segunda División B players
Hércules CF B players
Hércules CF players
RCD Espanyol B footballers
Cultural Leonesa footballers
Lorca FC players
CD Ebro players
Elche CF players
UD Ibiza players